Sausage gravy is a traditional Southern breakfast dish in the United States.  After loose pork sausage is cooked in a pan and removed, a roux is formed by browning flour in the residual fat. Milk and seasonings, such as salt and pepper, are added to create a moderately thick gravy, to which the cooked sausage is added. Occasionally, ingredients such as cayenne pepper or a spicy sausage are used to make a spicier gravy.

Sausage gravy is traditionally served as part of the dish biscuits and gravy and accompanied by other typical Southern breakfast items, such as fried eggs, sliced tomatoes and bacon.

Combination gravy is a variation resulting from using the combined fat of bacon and sausage to make gravy. The resulting gravy is slightly darker in color than straight sausage gravy and carries the flavor of the bacon. This style is prevalent in North Georgia.

See also
 List of sausage dishes

References

External links
Recipe: Sausage Gravy

Cuisine of the Southern United States
Sausage dishes
American breakfast foods
American pork dishes
Meat-based sauces